Winslow is a masculine given name which may refer to:

People:
 Winslow Ames (1907–1990), American art historian and museum director
 Winslow Anderson (1917–2007), American painter, ceramicist and glass designer
 Winslow Ashby (born 1953), Barbadian cricketer
 Winslow Briggs (1928–2019), American biologist
 Winslow Carlton (1907–1994), American businessman
 Winslow Corbett (born 1979), American actress
 Winslow Eliot (born 1956), American novelist
 Winslow W. Griesser (1856–1931), American station keeper in the United States Life-Saving Service
 Winslow Hall (rower) (1912–1995), American rower
 Winslow Homer (1836–1910), American landscape painter and printmaker
 Winslow Lewis (1770–1850), American lighthouse builder
 Winslow Lovejoy, American college football player
 Winslow McCleary (1886–1973), Canadian rower
 Winslow Oliver (born 1973), American football player
 Winslow Terrill (1870–1897), American baseball player
 Winslow Upton (1853–1914), American astronomer
 Winslow Warren (1838–1930), American attorney
 Winslow Wilson (1892–1974), American painter

Fictional characters:
 Winslow Leach, the protagonist of the 1974 horror film Phantom of the Paradise
 Winslow T. Oddfellow, from the animated television series CatDog
 Winslow, a character in Questionable Content
 Winslow, a character in It's a Big Big World

Masculine given names